The Double Eagle is a remotely operated vehicle (ROV) built by the Swedish defence company Saab Underwater Systems AB and used for the disposal of naval mines.

Design
As of 2009, four versions of the ROV have been designed.

The original version was named the Sea Eagle, and was a militarised variant of the civilian Sea Owl ROV. These ROVs saw service with the Swedish Navy from 1984 onwards.

Current models
The Double Eagle Mark II is larger but lighter than the first Double Eagle. The Mark II entered service in 1994.

The Mark III is  longer and  heavier than its predecessor.

The ROV's payload can consist of scanning sonar, echo locations, doppler logs, or self-navigation systems. All Double Eagles are equipped with an extendable manipulator arm, which is commonly used to place a small explosive charge on a mine. The ROV can be modified to double as a self-propelled variable depth sonar: the Mark II Double Eagles fitted to the French Navy's s have been altered to carry a Thales TSM 2022 sonar, while a similar upgrade is to occur to the Mark III units being acquired for the Tripartites of the Royal Netherlands Navy.

The Double Eagle Mark II uses two 5 kilowatt brushless electric motors for main propulsion, and six 0.4 kilowatt brushless electric motors for fine manoeuvering. Mark III ROVs have four 7 kilowatt brushless electric motors as main thrusters. Double Eagles can operate in any orientation.

Operators

Mark II

 

  (Standard Flex module)

Mark III

 

 

 Koster-class minehunter

Citations

References

Mine warfare countermeasures
Robotic submarines